Alamovtsi (Аламовци) is a village in southern Bulgaria, Zlatograd municipality, Smolyan Province, located near the border with Greece.

Villages in Smolyan Province